The Nebraska Coast Connection is a social networking group founded in 1992 which allows professionals working in the entertainment industry to share their experiences growing up in Nebraska. Members provide advice and insights into succeeding in the entertainment industry centered in Los Angeles, CA.

In 1992, Producer/Director Todd Nelson started the NCC with about thirty fellow Nebraskans to be both a network for entertainment professionals and a bridge between home and Hollywood. The idea was fostered by Todd's frequent trips home. He often visited late UN-L theatre professor Dr. Bill Morgan, who connected him with former students who were pursuing careers in the arts. With support from the University of Nebraska Foundation, the first NCC cocktail event in Bel Air drew 200 people, and the Nebraska Coast Connection was up and running.

Since then, they have hosted barbeques, play nights, Halloween parties, Christmas caroling and comedy nights. They've produced radio commercials, a few short films and two extensive websites.

But the centerpiece of the group since 1995 has been the regular monthly gatherings called The Hollywood Salon. Not to be confused with the place you get your hair done, the idea of an artist's salon has a rich history. From ancient times, writers and painters and poets and politicians have met in salon settings to share their art and discuss events of the day. In Athens, Paris and New York, Salons were important ways for ideas to germinate, artists to be discovered and valuable relationships to blossom. The Hollywood Salon continues that tradition with a slant toward careers in showbiz.

More than 2,000 Nebraskans have found their way into the Coast Connection. About sixty of them attend each monthly Salon. Writers, Actors, Directors, Producers, Musicians, Execs, P.A.s and more than a few Waiters take part. "Wanna-be's" are most welcome. Over the years, hundreds of newly arrived Nebraskans have found jobs and apartments, friends, collaborators, even spouses through the NCC Hollywood Salons. It's a casual, after-work gathering place for a drink and a bite to eat. It's a place to reunite with old friends and get to know new ones. It's an exciting resource and networking opportunity. Special guests like Director Alexander Payne, Screenwriter Lew Hunter, Actress Marg Helgenberger and other prominent Nebraskans in Hollywood often drop in to share their secrets of success. The group has met the second Monday of every month since 1995 and continues to meet at the Culver Hotel in Culver City, California.

A long-time supporter and Nebraska native, Alexander Payne, held a special screening of his Oscar nominated film, Nebraska, for the group's members in the Sherry Lansing Theater on the Paramount Studios lot in November 2013. Todd Nelson, the group's founder, also accompanied Payne to Cannes for the film's premiere.

Guests include Nebraska natives Chris Klein, Abbie Cobb, Jim Hanna, Harley Jane Kozak and Jon Bokenkamp.

Colleen Williams of NTV News traveled to California in February 2015 for a feature segment and interview with founder, Todd Nelson.

Leo Adam Biga, author of "Alexander Payne: His Journey In Film," wrote extensively about the group.

Blogger, Scott W. Smith, regularly features the organization.

References

Social networks